Legislative elections were held in Åland on 20 October 1979 to elect members of the Landstinget. The 30 members were elected for a four-year term by proportional representation.

The 1979 elections saw the first participation of the Åland Centre, which had formed from a loose electoral organisation known as Landsbygdens och skärgårdens valförbund (LOS); the Liberals for Åland, which had been formed by a merger of LOS-Liberalerna (itself a break-away organisation from LOS) and Mittenliberalerna; and the Ålandic Left.

Results

External links
Parties and Elections in Europe
Legislative Assembly elections

Elections in Åland
Aland
1979 in Finland
October 1979 events in Europe